Sean Farrell (born November 2, 2001) is an American ice hockey left wing for Harvard of the National Collegiate Athletic Association (NCAA). Farrell was drafted 124th overall by the Montreal Canadiens in the 2020 NHL Entry Draft.

Playing career
During the 2020–21 season, Farrell recorded 29 goals and 72 assists in 53 games for the Chicago Steel, becoming the second player in USHL history to surpass 100 points in a season, after Kevin Roy in 2012. Following an outstanding season, he was awarded the USHL Player of the Year and Dave Tyler Junior Player of the Year Award.

Farrell began his collegiate career for the Harvard Crimson during the 2022–23 season. During his freshman year he led the conference in goals (17), assists (19), and points (36). He finished fourth in the conference with three game-winners and third with 77 shots through 22 games. Following an outstanding season he was named to the All-ECAC Hockey First Team and the ECAC Hockey Player of the Year.

International play

Farrell represented the United States at the 2019 IIHF World U18 Championships where he recorded two assists in seven games and won a bronze medal. On January 13, 2022, Farrell was named to Team USA's roster to represent the United States at the 2022 Winter Olympics. In his Olympic debut, he scored a hat-trick to help lead Team USA to an 8–0 victory over the host nation China.

On May 5, 2022, Farrell was named to the United States men's national ice hockey team to compete at the 2022 IIHF World Championship. He recorded two goals and four assists in ten games.

Career statistics

Regular season and playoffs

International

Awards and honors

References

External links
 

2001 births
Living people
Chicago Steel players
Harvard Crimson men's ice hockey players
Ice hockey players from Massachusetts
Montreal Canadiens draft picks
People from Hopkinton, Massachusetts
Sportspeople from Middlesex County, Massachusetts
USA Hockey National Team Development Program players
Ice hockey players at the 2022 Winter Olympics
Olympic ice hockey players of the United States